The Naypyidaw Safari Park is a wildlife park, located in Naypyidaw, Myanmar (Burma). The park consists of a  Asian safari, a  Australian safari and a  African safari. The Asian safari has over 100 rare wildlife animals including the domesticated wild oxen, sambur, and different kinds of deer, while the Australian one features various types of leopards and the African one various African deer, camels, goats, lions, tigers, rhinos, ostriches, giraffes, zebras and ponies. Visitors can see the wildlife by buggy.

The construction of the park began in November 2010.

See also
 National Herbal Park
 Naypyidaw Water Fountain Garden
 Naypyidaw Zoological Gardens

References

Parks in Myanmar
Naypyidaw